Caroline van Nieuwenhuyze-Leenders (born 12 September 1967) is a former Dutch field hockey player.

Playing career
She was a member of the  Dutch national team between 1987 and 1992. During this time, she played in 75 official international matches, scoring two goals. With the Dutch national team, van Nieuwenhuyze placed 6th in the  1992 Olympic Games and won gold in the 1990 Women's World Cup. Van Nieuwenhuyze also played for Tempo '34, HC Rotterdam, Amsterdamsche Hockey & Bandy Club and HGC. She has won a total of four national championships: two with Amsterdam and two with HGC.

Coaching career
After her career as a player, van Nieuwenhuyze worked for the  Royal Dutch Hockey Association for seven years, where she was national coach of the Dutch girls A and the Juniors. With Jong Oranje she became world champion in Seoul in 1997. 

Van Nieuwenhuyze has also coached with several clubs, including HC Rotterdam, Laren, HV Victoria, and HDM. In 2013 she served as head trainer at HC Voorne, where she supports and guides the trainers and coaches of the club through courses and clinics.

References

External links
 

1967 births
Living people
Dutch female field hockey players
Amsterdamsche Hockey & Bandy Club players
HC Rotterdam players
HGC players
Olympic field hockey players of the Netherlands
Field hockey players at the 1992 Summer Olympics
20th-century Dutch women
21st-century Dutch women